Kettler is a surname of Germanic origins, particularly in Germany and Austria. Notable people with the surname include:
 Donald Joseph Kettler (born 1944) Catholic Bishop of St Cloud.
 Ferdinand Kettler (1655–1737) Duke of Courland
 Frederick Casimir Kettler (1650–1698) Duke of Courland
 Gotthard Kettler (1517–1587), founder of the Duchy of Courland
 Jacob Kettler (1610–1682) Duke of Courland
 Robert C. Kettler, Washington D.C. area real estate developer (1952- current)
 Wilhelm Kettler (1574–1640) Duke of Courland
 Frederick William, Duke of Courland or Friedrich Kettler (1692–1711)
House of Kettler Noble House

See also
Ketteler

Low German surnames
Germanic-language surnames
Occupational surnames